Applewood Heights Secondary School is a public secondary school in Mississauga, Ontario, Canada and is part of the Peel District School Board. It offers a Specialist High Skills Major in sports (SHSM), and a regional sports program (RSP).

Notable students and alumni
Paul Fromm, former teacher at the school who is also a white supremacist and neo-Nazi
Taurean Allen, CFL player for the Calgary Stampeders
Danny Antonucci, animator
Tony Burgess, author
Doug Davies, CFL lineman
Tom Kostopoulos, NHL player for the New Jersey Devils
Luc Mullinder, CFL retired player for the Montreal Alouettes
Brandon Onkony, Swiss professional soccer player playing for Hobro IK in the Danish Superliga
PartyNextDoor, signed to Drake's OVO Sound label
Aqsa Parvez, murder victim
Rathika Sitsabaiesan, MP for Scarborough—Rouge River

See also

List of high schools in Ontario

References

Peel District School Board
High schools in Mississauga
Educational institutions established in 1966
1966 establishments in Ontario